Fox Hills is a neighborhood of Culver City, California.  It is roughly triangular in shape, bounded by West Slauson Avenue to the north, Centinela Avenue on the south, the San Diego Freeway to the southwest, and Canterbury Drive to the southeast. 

Fox Hills was annexed to Culver City in 1964, at which time it consisted of undeveloped land, riding stables, and golf courses.  In the 1970s, the neighborhood was developed with apartments, condominiums, and the Fox Hills Mall, an indoor shopping center that opened in 1975.

The Fox Hills neighborhood is home to Fox Hills Park, which is located at the intersection of Green Valley Circle and Buckingham Parkway. The ten-acre park includes a playground, basketball court, soccer field, tennis court, jogging trail, picnic areas, barbecues, and restroom facilities.

References

External links 

Fox Hills Park
Westfield Fox Hills Mall

Neighborhoods in Culver City, California